Jaakko Tapio Oksanen (born 7 November 2000) is a Finnish professional footballer who plays as a midfielder for KuPS. He is a product of the HJK Helsinki academy and following four years with Brentford, he transferred to KuPS in 2022. Oksanen is a current Finland international at senior and youth level.

Club career

HJK Helsinki 
A holding midfielder, Oksanen began his career in his native Finland as a youth with KP-75 and KOPSE, before entering the academy at Veikkausliiga club HJK Helsinki at the age of 12. He made his debut for Klubi 04 during an injury-hit 2016 season and signed a new one-year contract in December 2016. Oksanen made 24 appearances and scored two goals during a successful 2017 season for Klubi 04, which ended with promotion to the Ykkönen, via the playoffs. One week after the playoff victory, Oksanen made his senior debut for HJK Helsinki, as an 81st-minute substitute for Evans Mensah in a 3–2 defeat to RoPS on 28 October 2017. It proved to be his only appearance for the first team and he departed the Telia 5G -areena on 13 January 2018.

Brentford 
On 13 January 2018, Oksanen moved to England to sign for the B team at Championship club Brentford on a -year contract for an undisclosed fee. An injury crisis saw Oksanen feature as an unused substitute during three first team matches in November 2018, before he suffered an ankle ligament injury. After returning to fitness, Oksanen was a regular inclusion in matchday squads during the final two months of the 2018–19 season and made his debut as a substitute for Sergi Canós late in a 3–0 victory over Preston North End on the final day. He was also a member of the B team's 2018–19 Middlesex Senior Cup-winning squad.

Oksanen spent the majority of the 2019–20 pre-season with the first team squad and made two appearances during the regular season. Entering the final months of his contract, Oksanen signed a two-year extension in March 2020 and his B team performances were recognised with the team's 2019–20 Player of the Year award. On 13 August 2020, Oksanen joined League One club AFC Wimbledon on a season-long loan. Either side of two months out due to a mid-season ankle injury, he made 30 appearances during his spell.

On 31 August 2021, Oksanen joined Scottish Championship club Greenock Morton on loan until 3 January 2022 and made 16 appearances during his spell. He played the remainder of the 2021–22 season with Brentford B and was a part of the London Senior Cup-winning squad. Following  years with Brentford (during which he made 88 B team appearances and three first team appearances), Oksanen was released when his contract expired at the end of the 2021–22 season.

KuPS 
On 10 July 2022, Oksanen transferred to Veikkausliiga club KuPS and signed an 18-month contract, with the option of a further year, effective 13 July 2022. During the remainder of the 2022 season, he made 17 appearances, scored two goals and was a part of the club's 2022 Finnish Cup-winning squad. In recognition of his performances, Oksanen was voted the club's Player of the Year and Young Player of the Year and was twice named in the Veikkausliiga Team of the Month.

International career 
Oksanen has been capped by Finland at U16, U17, U18, U19 and U21 level. He appeared in each of Finland's three matches at the 2018 European U19 Championship and his development during 2018 was recognised with the SPL Most Promising Young Player of the Year award.

On 30 December 2022, Oksanen won his maiden call into the full Finland squad for a January 2022 training camp in Algarve, which included two friendly matches. He made his full international debut with a start in the second match, a 1–0 defeat to Estonia.

Career statistics

International

Honours 
Klubi 04
 Kakkonen play-offs: 2017

Brentford B
 Middlesex Senior Cup: 2018–19
 London Senior Cup: 2021–22
KuPS
 Finnish Cup: 2022

Individual
 SPL Most Promising Young Player of the Year: 2018
 Brentford B Player of the Year: 2019–20
 Veikkausliiga Team of the Month: August 2022, October 2022
 KuPS Player of the Year: 2022
 KuPS Young Player of the Year: 2022

References

External links 
 
 
 
 Jaakko Oksanen at palloliitto.fi

2000 births
Living people
Finnish footballers
Helsingin Jalkapalloklubi players
Finland youth international footballers
Veikkausliiga players
Finnish expatriate sportspeople in England
Footballers from Helsinki
Klubi 04 players
Association football midfielders
Brentford F.C. players
Kakkonen players
Finland under-21 international footballers
AFC Wimbledon players
Greenock Morton F.C. players
Finnish expatriate footballers
Finnish expatriate sportspeople in Scotland
Expatriate footballers in England
Expatriate footballers in Scotland
Scottish Professional Football League players
Kuopion Palloseura players
Finland international footballers